Ishq Nachaya (Urdu: نچایا عشق, Ishq Nachaya) (English: Dance of Love) is a Pakistani drama serial that onair on  21 july 2016 Express Entertainment directed by Mohsin Talat, scripted by Zeffer Imran, and produced by Abdul Mannan Wai Qureshi, under their production banner AMW Production,. The story is an intricate dance of love and how it transforms even the most devilish of characters to kneel when love comes knocking at their hearts.

Cast
 Imran Ashraf as Ramzi
 Diya Mughal as Sania 
 Yasir Shoro as Shayan
 Faryal Rajput as Soni
 Saleem Meraj as Sarwar
 Erfan Motiwala as Saleem
 Saba Faisal as Sakina 
 Shahzad Ali Khan as Shaukat
 Rubina Arif as Sughra
 Hashim Butt as Faizan
 Shaheen Khan as Sultana

Episodes

Soundtrack

The show's theme song "Ishq Nachaya" was composed by Wajid Saeed and sung by Wajji Ali. It was written by Muhammad Nasir. The song is frequently played throughout the show's episodes.

External links

 Express Press Add
 Express Tribune Press Add
 Express Entertainment

References

Pakistani drama television series